Brian T. Delaney is an American actor known for voicing Scarecrow on Batman Unlimited and the male Sole Survivor in Fallout 4.

Filmography

Voice acting

Film

Television

Video games

Live-action

References

External links
 
 

American male television actors
American male video game actors
American male voice actors
21st-century American male actors

Living people
Year of birth missing (living people)

Place of birth missing (living people)